Anna Aloysia Maximiliane Louise von Lamberg (? - died 28 June 1738) was an Austrian countess who was successively the mistress of Augustus II the Strong, King of Poland, and Aleksander Benedykt Sobieski. She is known to history as Countess Esterle.

Countess Maximiliane of Lamberg was the daughter of an Austrian count, Kaspar Friedrich von Lamberg-Kunstadt, and his first wife, Marie Františka Terezie Hýzrlová z Chodů, a Czech noblewoman. In 1695 she married Graf Franz Michael Hiserle (Esterle) von Chodau.

She became the mistress of Augustus II the Strong in either 1696, with the affair lasting until 1699, or 1704 (the latter date favoured by the author of Sex with Kings). Her first husband divorced her in 1697, and in 1698 she married graf Gustav Hanibal von Oppersdorff (Oppersdorf). On 1 November 1698, she gave birth to a son, graf von Oppersdorf, whose father was supposedly Augustus II. The child died soon after birth. Her relationship with Augustus II ended when the "playboy king" discovered that Maximiliane had been having affairs with several gentlemen at court; she was given 24 hours to leave the country.

Later, in Wrocław, she became the mistress of Aleksander Benedykt Sobieski, who had been Augustus's rival in the 1697 election for the Polish throne.

She died on 28 June 1738 in Wrocław. Her husband, Graf von Oppersdorff (Oppersdorf), died on 29 December 1744 in Kostelec nad Orlicí.

References

17th-century Bohemian people
17th-century Austrian people
17th-century Polish people
18th-century Bohemian people
18th-century Austrian people
18th-century Polish people
1738 deaths
Mistresses of Augustus the Strong
Austrian people of Czech descent
Czech expatriates in Poland
Austrian expatriates in Poland
Polish people of Austrian descent
Polish people of Czech descent
Austrian countesses
Bohemian nobility
Anna Aloysia
Silesian nobility
Year of birth unknown
18th-century Austrian women
17th-century Austrian women
18th-century Polish women
17th-century Polish women
18th-century Bohemian women
17th-century Bohemian women